Huangcun Area is an area and a town situated in the northwest corner of Daxing District, Beijing, China. Since the creation of several subdistricts in 2001 and 2009, Huangcun has remained 3 regions that are disconnected from each other. It was home to 176,890 inhabitants in the 2020 census.

During the Yuan dynasty, this region was flooded by Guyu River and formed a large desert landscape. It was named Huangcun at first, and the name got corrupted to Huangcun in the Qing dynasty.

History

Administrative divisions 
By 2021, Huangcun Area consisted of 46 subdivisions, of those 11 were residential communities, 33 were villages and 2 were industrial areas:

Gallery

See also 

 List of township-level divisions of Beijing

References 

Towns in Beijing
Daxing District
Areas of Beijing